Rize Atatürk Stadium was a multi-purpose stadium in Rize, Turkey.  It was used mostly for football matches and was the home ground of Çaykur Rizespor.

The stadium held 10,459 people.

Notes and references

Football venues in Turkey
Sports venues in Rize
Multi-purpose stadiums in Turkey
Things named after Mustafa Kemal Atatürk